The Skorge Hydroelectric Power Station ( or Skorge kraftstasjon) is a hydroelectric power station in the municipality of Stad in Vestland county, Norway. Part of its catchment area lies in the municipality of Vanylven.

The plant operates at an installed capacity of  using a Pelton wheel, with an average annual production of about 6 GWh. It is owned by Sogn og Fjordane Energi and came into operation in 1936.

References

Hydroelectric power stations in Norway
Stad, Norway
Energy infrastructure completed in 1936
1936 establishments in Norway